Têso or Teso is a Portuguese hamlet located in the parish of Estela, Póvoa de Varzim.

Parishes of Póvoa de Varzim